Bernard Eugène Mayeur (23 February 1938 – 11 January 2004) was a French basketball player. He competed in the men's tournament at the 1960 Summer Olympics.

References

External links

1938 births
2004 deaths
French men's basketball players
1963 FIBA World Championship players
Olympic basketball players of France
Basketball players at the 1960 Summer Olympics
Basketball players from Paris